Bruno Conti (born 13 March 1955) is an Italian football manager and former player. He is currently head of A.S. Roma's youth sector.

Throughout his playing career, Conti was usually deployed as a winger, and also previously played for Roma, where he spent his entire club career, aside from two season-long loan spells with Genoa in the 1970s. He is considered by many in the sport to be one of the greatest Italian players of all time in his position. Nicknamed "The Mayor of Rome", Conti was an important figure in the club's history, and won a league title as well as five Coppa Italia titles during his time in the Italian capital.

At international level, he was notably a member of Italy's 1982 FIFA World Cup winning team, and also took part at the 1986 FIFA World Cup.

Early life
A native of Nettuno, a comune in the province of Rome, Conti is one of seven children and was a keen baseball player in his youth. His father Andrea was a bricklayer.

Club career
Conti spent his entire career, aside from two year-long loan spells at Genoa in Serie B during the 1975–76 (during which he won the Serie B title) and the 1978–79 seasons, at Roma. He had initially been a member of the club's youth squad between 1972 and 1974, eventually making his senior club and Serie A debut on 10 February 1974, in a 0–0 home draw against Torino, during the 1973–74 Season, under Nils Liedholm, at the age of 19. As a youngster, he had been overlooked by scouts during trials with several professional clubs, including Roma manager Helenio Herrera, who felt that his physique would not allow him to succeed at the top level, despite his talent.

During his time with the Roma, Conti famously wore the number 7 shirt, and he became an important figure with the club on the right wing, as he won the Scudetto during the 1982–83 season and the Coppa Italia five times between 1979 and 1991. He played a key role in helping Roma to reach the 1984 European Cup Final, where they were defeated on penalties by Liverpool, with Conti missing his penalty in the shootout. He also helped Roma to reach the 1991 UEFA Cup Final, during his final season with the club, also winning his final Coppa Italia that season.

Due to his performances for Roma throughout his club career, Conti was given the nickname: "The Mayor of Rome". He was one of the eleven members to be inducted into the A.S. Roma Hall of Fame in 2012.

International career

Conti made his senior international debut for Italy on 11 October 1980, in a 2–0 win against Luxembourg. He scored his first goal for Italy in a 2–0 home win against Yugoslavia, in Turin, on 15 November 1980 during their 1982 FIFA World Cup qualifying campaign. Upon becoming a regular member of the Italy national side, he was often regarded as the heir of his more experienced teammate, Causio, due to their similar role and playing style.

Conti was part of the Italy national side that won the 1982 FIFA World Cup in Spain, featuring in every match of the tournament, and scoring a goal in Italy's first round draw against Peru. In the final against West Germany, despite being booked after 31 minutes, he was a central figure in Italy's second goal that was scored by Marco Tardelli, and he single-handedly created Italy's third goal by breaking down the right side from the half-way line through the German defence, and crossing the ball to Alessandro Altobelli, who scored from the top of the box after 81 minutes. He also won a penalty for Italy during the match, which Cabrini failed to convert, however. The Italians won the final game 3–1 and they were awarded their third World Cup title. Conti was elected to be part of the team of the tournament for his performances. Due to his pace, flair, creativity, influence, and technical ability, Conti was given the nickname "Mara-Zico" throughout the World Cup (a reference to the players Maradona and Zico); at the conclusion of the tournament, Pelé stated that he believed that Conti had been the best player of the tournament, and that he was one of the best players in the world.

Conti continued to be an important member of the Italian squad throughout the 1980s, although the team failed to qualify for the 1984 European Championship. Conti took part with Italy at the 1986 FIFA World Cup, playing in every match; the Italians were eliminated in the round of 16. He retired from international football after the tournament, following manager Enzo Bearzot's departure from the national team. In total, he managed 5 goals in 47 appearances for Italy between 1980 and 1986.

Post-retirement
After retiring, Conti remained at Roma as a member of the youth sector's coaching staff. Following the departure of coach Luigi Delneri, he moved up from his position as head of the club's youth teams to first team coach during the 2004–05 season. Conti did not possess a coaching licence, but was a respected figure at the club, and at the time, World Cup winners were exempted from taking the coaching exams needed to obtain an official Serie A coaching licence. He led Roma to the Coppa Italia final and to a UEFA Cup berth. His short term role as caretaker manager finished when Roma appointed Luciano Spalletti as coach.

Conti later became Technical Director (Direttore tecnico) and is currently in charge of the Youth Sector (Responsabile del Settore Giovanile).

Conti is featured in the football video game FIFA 14s Classic XI – a multi-national all-star team, along with compatriots Giacinto Facchetti, Gianni Rivera, and Franco Baresi.

Style of play
Normally a winger in midfield or in the offensive line, Conti was among the best players in the world during his prime, and is regarded as one of Italy's greatest wingers, and by some, even as Italy's best right winger ever. Despite being left footed, he was capable of playing on either flank, and also in the centre as an attacking midfielder, although he was usually deployed on the right as a wide midfielder. A diminutive winger, with a slender physique, he was a quick, agile, dynamic, creative, and hard-working player, with excellent technical ability, who was renowned for his pace, outstanding dribbling skills, vision, passing, and crossing ability, which allowed to create chances for his teammates, and made him an excellent assist provider, while also enabling him to function as a playmaker. Due to his significant speed, stamina, control, flair, and his ability with either foot, he was capable of beating players on the run, as well as during one on one situations, with feints; known for his tactical intelligence, he also had an excellent positional sense, and he excelled at making attacking runs down the wing to lose his markers and deliver balls into the area to his teammates. Despite not being particularly prolific in front of goal throughout his career, in part due to his more creative role in his team, he also possessed a powerful and accurate shot from distance with either foot. A precocious talent in his youth, Conti later established himself as one of the greatest Italian players of his generation, and is regarded as one of Roma's best ever players.

Personal life
Conti and his wife Laura have two sons, Daniele and Andrea, both former professional footballers. Daniele's son and his grandson, Bruno Conti Jr. plays for Cagliari Primavera.

HonoursGenoaSerie B: 1975–76RomaSerie A: 1982–83
Coppa Italia: 1979–80, 1980–81, 1983–84, 1985–86, 1990–91ItalyFIFA World Cup: 1982Individual'
A.S. Roma Hall of Fame: 2012
Italian Football Hall of Fame: 2017

References

External links

Profile and Statistics  on Italian FA website 

1955 births
Living people
People from Nettuno
Italian footballers
Italy international footballers
Italian football managers
A.S. Roma players
Serie A players
Serie B players
A.S. Roma managers
Serie A managers
FIFA World Cup-winning players
1982 FIFA World Cup players
1986 FIFA World Cup players
Genoa C.F.C. players
Association football wingers
A.S. Roma non-playing staff
Footballers from Lazio
Sportspeople from the Metropolitan City of Rome Capital